Carmen Cardinali Paoa (born 21 June 1944) is a Rapa Nui Chilean professor. She served as the governor of Easter Island (Rapa Nui) in the government of president Sebastián Piñera, between 2010 and 2014.

A native of the island, Cardinali hasworked as a professor in Santiago and also in Easter Island's tourism industry.

Cardinali's predecessor, former Governor Pedro Edmunds Paoa, resigned in early August 2010 following the occupation of six buildings by protesters who demanded the return of land to the descendants of the island's indigenous Polynesian inhabitants. Lawyer Jorge Miranda was appointed as interim Governor until a replacement could be found.

Chilean deputy Interior Minister Rodrigo Ubilla appointed Carmen Cardinali as Governor of Easter Island in early September 2010 to replace Edmunds. Cardinali's challenges included archeological preservation of the island's heritage and revamping the tourist industry. She served as a Governor until March 2014, being replaced by Marta Raquel Hotus Tuki, appointed by president Michelle Bachelet.

References

1944 births
Academic staff of the University of Santiago, Chile
Easter Island
Rapanui politicians
Easter Island people
Living people
Women governors of provinces of Chile